A chef de partie, station chef, or line cook is a chef in charge of a particular area of production in a restaurant. In large kitchens, each chef de partie might have several cooks or assistants.

In most kitchens, however, the chef de partie is the only worker in that department. Line cooks are often divided into a hierarchy of their own, starting with "first cook", then "second cook", and continuing as needed by the establishment.

Station chef titles
Station chefs who are part of the brigade system:

See also

References

Culinary terminology
Restaurant terminology